Incremental reading is a software-assisted method for learning and retaining information from reading, which involves the creation of flashcards out of electronic articles. "Incremental reading" means "reading in portions". Instead of a linear reading of articles one at a time, the method works by keeping a large reading list of electronic articles or books (often dozens or hundreds of them) and reading parts of several articles in each session. Articles in the reading list are prioritized by the user. In the course of reading, key points of articles are broken up into flashcards, which are then learned and reviewed over an extended period of time with the help of a spaced repetition algorithm.

This use of flashcards at later stages of the process is based on the spacing effect (the phenomenon whereby learning is greater when studying is spread out over time) and the testing effect (the finding that long-term memory is increased when some of the learning period is devoted to retrieving the to-be-remembered information through testing). It is targeted towards people who are trying to learn for life a large amount of information, particularly if that information comes from various sources.

History

The method itself is often credited to the Polish software developer Piotr Woźniak. He implemented the first version of incremental reading in 1999 in SuperMemo 99, providing the essential tools of the method: a prioritized reading list, and the possibility to extract portions of articles and to create cloze deletions. The term "incremental reading" itself appeared the next year with SuperMemo 2000. Later SuperMemo programmes subsequently enhanced the tools and techniques involved, such as webpage imports, material overload handling, etc.

Limited incremental reading support for the text editor Emacs appeared in 2007.

An Anki add-on for incremental reading was later published in 2011; for Anki 2.0 and 2.1, another add-on is available.

Incremental reading was the first of a series of related concepts invented by Piotr Woźniak: incremental image learning, incremental video, incremental audio, incremental mail processing, incremental problem solving, and incremental writing. "Incremental learning" is the term Wozniak uses to refer to those concepts as a whole.

Method

When reading an electronic article, the user extracts the most important parts (similar to underlining or highlighting a paper article) and gradually distills them into flashcards. Flashcards are information presented in a question-answer format (making active recall possible). Cloze deletions are often used in incremental reading, as they are easy to create out of text. Both extracts and flashcards are scheduled independently from the original article.

With time and reviews, articles are supposed to be gradually converted into extracts, and extracts into flashcards. Hence, incremental reading is a method of breaking down information from electronic articles into sets of flashcards.

Contrary to extracts, flashcards are reviewed with active recall. This means that extracts such as "George Washington was the first U.S. president" must ultimately be converted into questions such as "Who was the first U.S. president?" (Answer: George Washington), or "Who was George Washington?" (Answer: the first U.S. president), etc., or cloze deletions such as "[BLANK] was the first U.S. president", "George Washington was [BLANK]", etc.

This flashcard creation process is semi-automated – the reader chooses which material to learn and edits the precise wording of the questions, while the software assists in prioritizing articles and making the flashcards, and does the scheduling: it calculates the time for the reader to review each chunk, according to the rules of a spaced repetition algorithm. This means that all processed pieces of information are presented at increasing intervals.

Individual articles are read in portions proportional to the attention span, which depends on the user, their mood, the article, etc. This allows for a substantial gain in attention, according to Piotr Wozniak.

Without the use of spaced repetition, the reader would quickly get lost in the glut of information when studying dozens of subjects in parallel. However, spaced repetition makes it possible to retain traces of the processed material in memory.

References

External links
 Kevin Purdy, Use Incremental Reading to Memorize Large Batches of Data (lifehacker.com)

Learning
Learning methods
Reading (process)